Perutnina Ptuj is a Continental cycling team. It was founded in 1985, as Kolesarski klub Ptuj and started as a recreative club. In 1992 Kolesarski klub Ptuj signed a list about permanent collaboration with Perutnina Ptuj and was renamed in Kolesarski klub Perutnina Ptuj. It is based in Slovenia and it participates in UCI Continental Circuits races.

Major wins

2002
Poreč Trophy III, Boštjan Mervar
Overall Istrian Spring Trophy, Jure Golčer
Stage 1, Boštjan Mervar
Stage 5 Tour of Slovenia, Boštjan Mervar
Raiffeisen GP, Boštjan Mervar
Stage 2 Tour of Austria, Boštjan Mervar
 Road Race Championships, Boris Premužič
2003
GP Istria 1, Boštjan Mervar
GP Istria 2, Dean Podgornik
GP Istria 3, Radoslav Rogina
Poreč Trophy II, Boštjan Mervar
Stage 1 Istrian Spring Trophy, Boštjan Mervar
Overall The Paths of King Nikola, Radoslav Rogina
Stages 1 & 3, Radoslav Rogina
GP Krka, Dean Podgornik
Overall Tour of Slovenia, Mitja Mahorič
Stage 6, Boštjan Mervar
Stage 8 Olympia's Tour, Dean Podgornik
Stage 2 Tour of Serbia, Miran Kelner
Stage 3b Tour of Serbia, Dean Podgornik
 Time Trial Championships, Mitja Mahorič
 Time Trial Championships, Radoslav Rogina
 Road Race Championships, Radoslav Rogina
Stage 3 UNIQA Classic, Boštjan Mervar
2004
Poreč Trophy, Matej Stare
Stage 2 Istrian Spring Trophy, Borut Božič
Overall The Paths of King Nikola, Massimo Demarin
Stage 2, Massimo Demarin
Overall Tour of Slovenia, Mitja Mahorič
Stages 2 & 3, Borut Božič
Stage 5, Mitja Mahorič
Stage 6 Olympia's Tour, Aldo Ino Ilešič
Stage 1 FBD Milk Ras, Valter Bonca
Stage 6 Tour de Serbie, Borut Božič
 Time Trial Championships, Matija Kvasina
 Road Race Championships, Tomislav Dančulović
2005
Stage 6 Vuelta a Cuba, Matej Marin
Stage 7 Vuelta a Cuba, Gregor Gažvoda
Overall Istrian Spring Trophy, Borut Božič
Prologue, Boštjan Mervar
Stage 2, Borut Božič
Overall The Paths of King Nikola, Mitja Mahorič
Stage 1b, Team Time Trial
Stage 1 Tour du Loir-et-Cher, Matej Stare
GP Kranj, Martin Hvastija
Stage 4 Tour of Slovenia, Boštjan Mervar
Overall Tour de Serbie, Matija Kvasina
Stage 1a, Matej Marin
Stage 2, Matija Kvasina
 Time Trial Championships, Gregor Gažvoda
 Road Race Championships, Mitja Mahorič
 Road Race Championships, Matija Kvasina
Stage 3 Tour de l'Avenir, Borut Božič
2006
Stage 4, 11b & 13 Vuelta a Cuba, Borut Božič
Stage 8 Vuelta a Cuba, Boštjan Mervar
Stage 11a Vuelta a Cuba, Matija Kvasina
Overall Istrian Spring Trophy, Borut Božič
Prologue, Borut Božič
Overall The Paths of King Nikola, Radoslav Rogina
Stage 2, Matej Stare
Stage 3, Radoslav Rogina
Stage 4, Mitja Mahorič
Stage 1 Circuit des Ardennes, Borut Božič
Overall Rhône-Alpes Isère Tour, Tomislav Dančulović
Stage 1, Matej Marin
Stages 1, 2 & 7 Olympia's Tour, Borut Božič
GP Hydraulika Mikolasek, Jure Golčer
GP Palma, Boštjan Mervar
GP Kranj, Boštjan Mervar
GP Triberg-Schwarzwald, Jure Golčer
GP Judendorf-Strassengel, Mitja Mahorič
Stages 1 & 4 Tour of Slovenia, Borut Božič
 Time Trial Championships, Matija Kvasina
 Road Race Championships, Hrvoje Miholjević
 Road Race Championships, Jure Golčer
Stage 4 Course de la Solidarité Olympique, Aldo Ino Ilešič
2007
Overall The Paths of King Nikola, Mitja Mahorič
Stage 1, Matej Stare
Stage 3 Tour du Loir-et-Cher, Mitja Mahorič
Belgrade-Čačak, Matija Kvasina
GP Triberg-Schwarzwald, Radoslav Rogina
Overall Tour de Serbie, Matej Stare
Stage 3, Radoslav Rogina
Stage 5, Matej Stare
 Time Trial Championships, Matija Kvasina
Stage 2 Course de la Solidarité Olympique, Matija Kvasina
Stage 4b Tour de Slovaquie, Matej Stare
Overall Tour de Croatie, Radoslav Rogina
Stage 3, Mitja Mahorič
2008
Stages 2 & 6 Vuelta a Cuba, Jure Kocjan
Stages 5 & 13 Vuelta a Cuba, Kristijan Koren
Stage 11 Vuelta a Cuba, Mitja Mahorič
Stage 12 Vuelta a Cuba, Mitja Mahorič
Prologue Istrian Spring Trophy, Kristijan Koren
Overall The Paths of King Nikola, Mitja Mahorič
Stages 1 & 2, Mitja Mahorič
Stage 3, Kristijan Fajt
Stage 4 Circuit des Ardennes, Gregor Gažvoda
Belgrade–Banja Luka II, Matej Stare
Belgrade–Čačak, Mitja Mahorič
GP Judendorf-Strassengel, Matej Stare
Velika Nagrada Ptuja, Gregor Gažvoda
Stage 2 Tour of Slovenia, Radoslav Rogina
Overall Tour de Serbie, Matija Kvasina
Stages 2 & 4, Radoslav Rogina
 Time Trial Championships, Matija Kvasina
 Time Trial Championships, Gregor Gažvoda
Stage 3 Tour of Qinghai Lake, Kristijan Fajt
Stage 9 Tour of Qinghai Lake, Jure Kocjan
Kroz Vojvodina II, Gregor Gažvoda
2009
Kroz Vojvodina I, Matej Marin
2010
Overall Istrian Spring Trophy, Robert Vrečer
Prologue & Stage 2, Robert Vrečer
Zagreb–Ljubljana, Matej Mugerli
Overall Tour de Slovaquie, Robert Vrečer
Stages 4 & 5, Robert Vrečer
Trofeo Bianchin, Robert Vrečer
2011
Overall Istrian Spring Trophy, Robert Vrečer
Prologue & Stage 2, Robert Vrečer
Overall Szlakiem Grodów Piastowskich, Robert Vrečer
Stage 2, Robert Vrečer
Prologue Tour of Slovenia, Robert Vrečer
Overall Tour of Qinghai Lake, Gregor Gazvoda
Stage 3, Gregor Gazvoda
Tour of Vojvodina I, Gregor Gazvoda
Stage 8 Tour of China, Matej Mugerli

2011 squad
As of May 30, 2011.

References

External links

Perutnina Ptuj results at Cycling Archives

UCI Continental Teams (Europe)
Cycling teams established in 1985
Cycling teams based in Slovenia
1985 establishments in Slovenia